Wheel of the Infinite is a 2000 fantasy novel by Martha Wells. It was first published by Eos/HarperCollins.

Plot 
The novels tells about the Wheel of the Infinite: a wheel that sets reality in check. The wheel is renewed every year but this year something goes wrong. The wheel shows a sign of darkness. The high priest the Celestial One summons Maskelle, an exile, to help investigate the cause of the looming darkness.

Reception

References 

2000 American novels
American fantasy novels